Hybrid Truck Bed Liners are coverings composed of more than 3 pieces that protect the inner portion of the truck bed from damage while also preventing load shifting and sun damage. These types of bedliners are composed of separate molded pieces for the truck sidewalls, tailgate, and front-wall, along with a polyurethane mat to prevent load slippage. Most are composed of UV treated material, but have also been manufactured as a rug type of material made of Polypropylene. Some are also composed of polyurea.

References

External links 
 What is a Hybrid Bed Liner?
 Hybrid Bed Liner

Trucks